Hall Road is a commercial road near the historic Mall Road in Lahore, Pakistan. Like the Mall Road, it is surrounded by buildings built by the British before Pakistan's independence in 1947. The name of the road comes from the fact that the British had built 4 huge halls along the road, which catered to meetings, exhibitions.

Today those halls have been converted into commercial buildings and is the hub of Lahore's electronics, TVs, mobile phones, computers. Hall Road, Lahore is one of the largest market of electronics, computers, magnets, CCTV, wire and cables, mobile phone accessories, DVDs.

Hall Road also houses the Cathedral Church of the Resurrection, Lahore which was established in 1881 under The Management of Lahore Diocesan Board of Education.

Hall road is declared as 'one way' by city traffic police and usually is expected to have heavy city traffic on it.

References

External links

Streets in Lahore
Roads in Lahore